The fourth season of the comedy television series, Modern Family aired on ABC from September 26, 2012 to May 22, 2013.

Production
On May 10, 2012, ABC renewed Modern Family for a fourth season. Filming for the fourth season began on July 30, 2012, and the season premiered on Wednesday, September 26, 2012.

Cast

 Ed O'Neill as Jay Pritchett
 Sofía Vergara as Gloria Pritchett
 Julie Bowen as Claire Dunphy
 Ty Burrell as Phil Dunphy
 Jesse Tyler Ferguson as Mitchell Pritchett
 Eric Stonestreet as Cameron Tucker
 Sarah Hyland as Haley Dunphy
 Ariel Winter as Alex Dunphy
 Nolan Gould as Luke Dunphy
 Rico Rodriguez as Manny Delgado
 Aubrey Anderson-Emmons as Lily Tucker-Pritchett
Modern Family employs an ensemble cast. The series is set in Los Angeles and focuses on the family lives of Jay Pritchett (Ed O'Neill), his daughter Claire Dunphy (Julie Bowen), and his son Mitchell Pritchett (Jesse Tyler Ferguson). Claire is a homemaker mom  married to Phil Dunphy (Ty Burrell); they have three children, Haley (Sarah Hyland), the typical teenager, Alex (Ariel Winter), the smart middle child and Luke (Nolan Gould), the offbeat only son. Jay is married to a much younger Colombian woman, Gloria (Sofía Vergara), and is helping her raise her teen son, Manny (Rico Rodriguez). Mitchell and his partner Cameron Tucker (Eric Stonestreet) have adopted a Vietnamese baby, Lily (Aubrey Anderson-Emmons). The kids are only required to appear in 22 episodes.

Episodes

Reception
The fourth season of Modern Family was met with mixed reviews. Willa Paskin of Salon gave the season a negative review, writing, "As Modern Family has gotten older, its characters, and their dynamics, have settled into grooves, some more discordant than others." Halfway through the season, Rachel Stein of Television Without Pity wrote, "much as I liked the pairings and some of the dialogue, ["New Year's Eve"] is just another contrived episode of Modern Family we can cite when we talk later about how a different show should have won the 2013 Emmy for Best Comedy."

On the other hand, Robert Bianco of USA Today gave the season a positive review, calling it "TV's most appreciated great comedy." In addition, The A.V. Club was often complimentary towards the season. All 24 episodes were reviewed, with "A−" and "B" as the most common letter grades assigned to a given one. Donna Bowman, reviewing "Goodnight Gracie," wrote that there were "few comedies on television more satisfying" when the season was at its best.

Some of the more well-received episodes include "Schooled," "Yard Sale," "Diamond in the Rough," and "Goodnight Gracie".

Ratings

Awards and nominations

Primetime Emmy Awards
The fourth season received twelve nominations at the 65th Primetime Emmy Awards in total, including its fourth consecutive nomination for Outstanding Comedy Series. The ceremony for the Primetime Awards was aired on September 22, 2013, on CBS. The Primetime Creative Arts Awards took place on September 15, 2013.

References

External links
 Episode recaps at ABC.com
 

2012 American television seasons
2013 American television seasons
4